Erythranthe tilingii is a species of monkeyflower known by the common name Tiling's monkeyflower. It was formerly known as Mimulus tilingii.

Distribution
It is native to much of western North America, from Alaska to California to New Mexico to Montana. It grows in moist and wet habitats, such as streambanks and mountain meadows, and is generally found at high elevation.

Description
Erythranthe tilingii is a rhizomatous perennial herb growing 2 to 35 centimeters tall. The oppositely arranged oval leaves may be several centimeters long and some are borne on short petioles. The yellow flower may be over 4 centimeters long, its narrow tubular throat opening into a wide, two-lipped mouth. The base of the flower tube is encapsulated in a calyx of sepals with uneven lobes.

Erythranthe tilingii is often nearly impossible to distinguish from its common relative, Mimulus guttatus, as their characteristics can intergrade; one of the most notable differences is the arrangement of the flowers, which are axial in M. tilingii but in a raceme in M. guttatus. By 2014 three species that were formerly been part of E. tilingii had been made their own separate species: Erythranthe caespitosa, Erythranthe corallina, Erythranthe minor.

References

External links

USDA Plants Profile: Mimulus tilingii
Jepson Manual Treatment - Mimulus tilingii
Mimulus tilingii - Photo gallery

tilingii
Flora of the Northwestern United States
Flora of the Southwestern United States
Flora of Alaska
Flora of California
Flora of New Mexico
Flora of the Sierra Nevada (United States)
Flora without expected TNC conservation status